K Siva Reddy is a Telugu poet from India who won Sahitya Akademi Award in Telugu, 1996 for his Poetry work Mohana-O-Mohana and was awarded the Saraswati Samman in 2018 for his poetry collection Pakkaki Ottigilite.

Career 

K. Siva Reddy retired principal of Vivek Vardhini College, Hyderabad and he taught English for thirty-five years there.
He has translated African and European poems into Telugu.

Bibliography

Poetry
Aame Evaraite Matram, Palapitta Prachuranalu, Hyderabad 2009
Posaganivannee, Jhari Poetry Circle, Hyderabad, 2008
Atanu-Charitra, Jhari Poetry Circle, Hyderabad, 2005
Vrittalekhini, Jhari Poetry Circle, Hyderabad, 2003
Antarjanam, Jhari Poetry Circle, Hyderabad, 2002
Kavisamayam, Sahiti Mitrulu, Vijayawada, 2000
Jaitrayatra, Sivareddy Mithrulu, Hyderabad 1999
Varsham, Varsham, Jhari Poetry Circle, Hyderabad, 1999 Naa Kalala Nadi Anchuna, Jhari Poetry Circle, Hyderabad, 1997
Ajeyam, Jhari Poetry Circle, Hyderabad, 1994
Sivareddy Kavita, Jhari Poetry Circle, Hyderabad, 1991
Mohana! Oh Mohana!, Jhari Poetry Circle, Hyderabad, 1988
Bharamiti, Jhari Poetry Circle, Hyderabad, 1983
Netra Dhanussu, Jhari Poetry Circle, Hyderabad, 1978
Aasupatrigeetam, Jhari Poetry Circle, Hyderabad, 1976
Charya, Jhari Poetry Circle, Hyderabad, 1975
Raktam Suryudu, Jhari Poetry Circle, Hyderabad, 1973

Awards and honours 

 Sahitya Akademi Award in Telugu, 1990.
 Saraswati Samman Award, 2018
 Siddartha Kalapeetham Puraskaram
 Dr. Somasunder Sahitya Puraskaram
 Visala Sahiti Award.

References 

1943 births
Living people
Recipients of the Saraswati Samman Award
Recipients of the Gangadhar National Award
Recipients of the Sahitya Akademi Award in Telugu